Sir Ramakrishna Gopal Bhandarkar,  (6 July 1837 – 24 August 1925) was an Indian scholar, orientalist, and social reformer.

Early life
Ramakrishna Bhandarkar was born in Malvan in Sindhudurg district of Maharashtra in a Gaud Saraswat Brahmin family. After early schooling in Ratnagiri, he studied at Elphinstone College in Bombay. Along with Mahadev Govind Ranade, Bhandarkar was among the first graduates in 1862 from Bombay University. He obtained his Master’s degree the following year, and was awarded a PhD from University of Göttingen in 1885.

Career
Ramakrishna Bhandarkar taught at Elphinstone College,(Mumbai) and Deccan College (Pune) during his distinguished teaching career. He was involved in research and writing throughout his life. He retired in 1894 as the Vice Chancellor of Bombay University. He participated in international conferences on Oriental Studies held in London (1874) and Vienna (1886), making invaluable contributions. Historian R. S. Sharma wrote of him: "He reconstructed the political history of the Satavahanas of the Deccan and the history of Vaishnavism and other sects.  A great social reformer, through his researches he advocated widow marriages and castigated the evils of the caste system and child marriage."

As an educationist, he was elected to the Imperial Legislative Council in  1903 as a non-official member. Gopal Krishna Gokhale was another member to the Council. In 1911 Bhandarkar was awarded by the British colonial government of India with the title of Companion of the Order of the Indian Empire.

Social reformer

In 1853, while a student, Bhandarkar became a member of the Paramhansa Sabha, an association for furthering liberal ideas which was then secret to avoid the wrath of the powerful and orthodox elements of contemporary society. Visits from Keshub Chandra Sen during 1864 had inspired the members of the Sabha.

Prarthana Samaj
In 1866, some of the members held a meeting at the home of Atmaram Pandurang and publicly pledged to certain reforms, including:
Denunciation of the caste system
encouragement of widow remarriage
encouragement of female education
abolition of child marriage.
The members concluded that religious reforms were required as a basis for social reforms. They held their first prayer meeting on 31 March 1867, which eventually led to the formation of the Prarthana Samaj.  Another visit by Keshub Chunder Sen and visits of Protap Chunder Mozoomdar and Navina Chandra Rai, founder of Punjab Brahmo Samaj, boosted their efforts.

Girls' education

In 1885, Bhandarkar along with noted social reformers Vaman Abaji Modak, and Justice Ranade established the Maharashtra Girls Education Society (MGE) . The society is the parent body of the first native run girls' high school in Pune popularly known as Huzurpaga. The school curriculum included subjects such as English literature, Arithmetics and Science right from its founding. The establishment of the school and its curriculum were vehemently opposed by Nationalist leader Lokmanya Tilak in his newspapers, the Mahratta and Kesari.

Selected works

Legacy
The Bhandarkar Oriental Research Institute in Pune is named after him.

References

External links
  Chronology of events in his life - (broken link)

Historians of South Asia
Scholars from Maharashtra
Indian orientalists
Marathi people
University of Mumbai alumni
University of Göttingen alumni
1837 births
1925 deaths
Indian Indologists
Members of the Imperial Legislative Council of India
Knights Commander of the Order of the Indian Empire
Indian knights
Indian social reformers
Hindu reformers
19th-century Indian historians
20th-century Indian historians
People from Sindhudurg district
Members of the Bombay Legislative Council
Prarthana Samaj
Founders of Indian schools and colleges